The obshchak (Russian), obštšak (Estonian spelling), or ühiskassa (Estonian) or "common treasury" is a traditional umbrella organisation of criminal groups in Estonia, a trade union of sorts that settles conflicts and establishes boundaries of the spheres of interest of various groups such as the Estonian mafia and Russian mafia. Between 2003 and 2016, the Common Fund was dominated by Nikolai Tarankov (1953–2016) and KGB training. However, Tarankov was found murdered in 2016, apparently in a revenge murder related to his past actions. The Common Fund pays for lawyers of caught members, purchases and delivers packages to imprisoned members, and covers other expenses. The organization has about ten member groups. The members have also operated significantly in Finland, where in 2009, high-level drug dealing was controlled by Estonians.

In 2005, the Estonian Central Criminal Police noticed a decline in revenues of the Common Fund, leading to the capture of several high-ranking members. The decline has been attributed to changes in Estonian society, particularly those experienced in the lead-up to accession to the European Union.

References 

Organized crime groups in Estonia
Organized crime groups in Finland
Factions of the Russian Mafia